Qalaşıxı (also, Kalashykhy) is a village in the Siazan Rayon of Azerbaijan. It forms part of the municipality of Zarat.

References 

Populated places in Siyazan District